The Northern Taurida operation (6 June – 3 November 1920)  was a military campaign of the Russian Civil War between the Red Army and the Wrangel Russian Army for the possession of Northern Taurida. The campaign can be divided into 3 stages: the White offensive (6 June – 3 July), trench warfare around the Kakhovka Bridgehead (20 August – 27 October) and the counterattack of the Red Army (28 October – 3 November).

Prelude 
In the course of the successive phases of the North Caucasus Operation in February-March 1920, the Red Army pushed the Armed Forces of South Russia out of the Northern Caucasus and Kuban. At the end of March, 35,000 White soldiers evacuated from Novorossiysk on British ships to Crimea. On 4 April 1920, Pyotr Wrangel became the new commander of the Armed Forces of South Russia and, on 11 May 1920, he reorganized it into the Russian Army.

Realizing the huge advantage of the Reds in the Civil War, Wrangel decided to take offensive actions, using the Red Army's involvement in Polish-Soviet War and the fact that the Red Army's Southern Front had been weakened in connection with it. The fight against Poland was directed by 1st Cavalry Army, leaving only the 6th and 13th Red Armies, along with the 2nd Cavalry Army, on the Southern Front. Meanwhile, by June 1920, Wrangel had mobilized about 40,000 soldiers under his command.

White offensive 
Wrangel's plan was to leave Crimea and conquer Northern Taurida, which would make it easier to feed his army and strengthen its defensive positions. On 6 June 1920, the 2nd Army Corps under the command of Yakov Slashchov landed at Kyrylivka on the shore of the Sea of Azov, at the rear of the 13th Red Army. The White forces managed to surprise the Reds and forced the 13th Red Army to retreat. Over the next few days, Pisarev's troops captured Melitopol, while the 1st Army Corps reached Oleksandrivsk and threatened Katerynoslav. The Whites captured 8,000 prisoners, 30 artillery cannons and two armoured trains. The commander of the Russian Army, however, decided not to continue his march north, knowing that the 13th Army had not yet been defeated and that his own troops were still too weak to continue. Instead, Wrangel hoped to further expand his troops in the captured territory, twice as large as that controlled when they had first evacuated to Crimea.

At the end of June, the command of the 13th Army directed a cavalry corps under the command of Dmitry Zhloba against the 1st Army Corps, tasking it with cutting off the White forces participating in the operation from Crimea. But Zhloba's poor leadership allowed the Whites to achieve a decisive victory; in the area of Tokmak and the German settlements of Lindenau and Heidelberg, Zhloba's forces were completely destroyed. In July 1920, Wrangel decided to only send two small units to Pryazovia. The first group of 1,000 people landed east of Mariupol and briefly took the Nikolaevskaya riverside hostel before being defeated by the Reds. The second group of 800 people managed to recruit a further 700 volunteers, and for several weeks conducted guerrilla warfare against the Bolsheviks, ultimately failing.

Kakhovka Bridgehead 
On 7 August 1920, units of the 13th Army commanded by Roberts Eidemanis crossed the Dnieper near the village of Kakhovka, to create a bridgehead on the left bank of the river, stop the expected further White offensive actions, and then force them to fall back to Crimea.

After the victory of the Polish troops in Battle of Warsaw and the retreat of the Red Army from Poland, the situation on the Southern Front completely changed to the detriment of the Whites. The break-up of white forces in North Taurida and Crimea became one of the main goals of the Bolshevik government, along with the conclusion of a peace treaty with Poland. On 19 August 1920, the Bolshevik Politburo identified the front of the fight against Wrangel as their main threat. Meanwhile, in the first half of September, Slashchov's 2nd Army Corps managed to move along the northern coast of the Sea of Azov and, on 15 September, it captured Mariupol.

On 27 September, Mikhail Frunze was appointed commander of the Southern Front and he ordered Semyon Budyonny's 1st Cavalry Army to join the Front. The arrival of Budyonny on the left bank of the Dnieper was expected in mid-October 1920. The Bolsheviks also managed to form an agreement with Nestor Makhno's Revolutionary Insurgent Army of Ukraine. In this situation, Wrangel ordered an attempt to liquidate the Kakhovka bridgehead before the 1st Cavalry Army joined the fighting. He decided not to withdraw to Crimea, lest his soldiers panic at the desperation of the situation. On 6 October, a group of troops under the command of  crossed the Dnieper near Khortytsia and briefly took Nikopol, but the first effect of surprise was quickly executed. Errors made by Dracenko eventually led to his defeat and forced his retreat to the left bank of the Dnieper on 13 October. The next day, the White's defeat ended the attack on the Kakhovka bridgehead.

Red counteroffensive 

The advantage of the Red Southern Front over Wrangel's forces at the end of October 1920 was more than threefold. The Reds counted over 133,000 soldiers (99,000 infantry and 33,000 cavalry), while the Whites numbered 35,000 (over 23,000 infantry and nearly 12,000 cavalry). They also had a decisive advantage in the number of machine guns. On 28 October 1920, units of the 6th Red Army under the command of August Kork and the 1st Cavalry Army under the command of Semyon Budyonny attacked the Whites from the Kakhovka bridgehead and broke the White defenses. On 29 October, the 51st Rifle Division commanded by Vasily Blyukher reached the Isthmus of Perekop, making it impossible for the Whites to retreat to Crimea through there. In the first days of November, the cavalry corps of  conducted a successful counterattack against the 1st Cavalry Army, throwing them out of Salkove and Rozhdestvenskoye, thanks to which the Whites managed to depart for Crimea. On 3 November, the Reds seized Salkove and Chonhar again, but were repelled from Crimea itself. In other sections of the front, however, the Reds did not achieve similarly quick successes. The march of the 2nd Cavalry Army under the command of Filipp Mironov was stopped by the Don Cossack cavalry. Similarly, the 13th Army, coming from the east, encountered more serious resistance from the 1st Kutepov Corps in the Melitopol region. As a result, the Red Army failed to completely break up the White movement or surround it in Northern Taurida.

Due to the fact that severe frosts started in Northern Taurida at the end of October, the Reds could not postpone further actions. On 7 November, the attack on the fortifications of Crimea began.

References

Bibliography
 
 
 
 
  
 
 

Battles of the Russian Civil War
Conflicts in 1920